Kalyan Dam, is an earthfill dam on Kalyan river near Jalna in the state of Maharashtra in India.

Specifications

Purpose
 Irrigation

See also
 Dams in Maharashtra
 List of reservoirs and dams in India

References

Dams in Jalna district
Dams completed in 1986
1986 establishments in Maharashtra